The 2015 Coupe Banque Nationale was a tennis tournament played on indoor carpet courts. It was the 23rd edition of the Tournoi de Québec and part of the WTA International tournaments of the 2015 WTA Tour. It took place at the PEPS de l'Université Laval in Quebec City, Canada, from September 14 through September 20, 2015.

Points and prize money

Point distribution

Prize money

Singles main draw entrants

Seeds

1 Rankings are as of August 31, 2015

Other entrants
The following players received wildcards into the singles main draw:
 Françoise Abanda
 Sharon Fichman
 Madison Keys

The following player entered the singles main draw with a protected ranking:
 Tamira Paszek

The following players received entry from the qualifying draw:
 Julia Boserup
 Samantha Crawford
 Amandine Hesse
 Kateryna Kozlova
 Mandy Minella
 Jessica Pegula

The following players received entry as lucky losers:
 Naomi Broady
 Nadiia Kichenok

Withdrawals
Before the tournament
 Vitalia Diatchenko →replaced by  Alla Kudryavtseva
 Edina Gallovits-Hall →replaced by  Paula Kania
 Olga Govortsova →replaced by  Barbora Krejčíková
 Madison Keys →replaced by  Nadiia Kichenok
 Klára Koukalová →replaced by  Naomi Broady
 Bethanie Mattek-Sands →replaced by  María Irigoyen
 Lesia Tsurenko →replaced by  Sachia Vickery

Retirements
 Françoise Abanda (neck injury)

Doubles main draw entrants

Seeds

1 Rankings are as of August 31, 2015

Other entrants
The following pair received wildcards into the doubles main draw:
 Malika Auger-Aliassime /  Charlotte Petrick

Champions

Singles

 Annika Beck def.  Jeļena Ostapenko, 6–2, 6–2

Doubles

 Barbora Krejčíková /  An-Sophie Mestach def.  María Irigoyen /  Paula Kania, 4–6, 6–3, [12–10]

References

External links
Official website

Coupe Banque Nationale
Tournoi de Québec
Coupe Banque Nationale
2010s in Quebec City